The Shire of Stanthorpe was a local government area of Queensland, Australia on the Queensland-New South Wales border. It was on the Great Dividing Range and was part of the Granite Belt. Its main industries included fruit and vegetable growing, wineries and tourism, and sheep and cattle grazing.

Its final mayor was Glen Rogers.

History 

On 11 November 1879, the Stanthorpe Division was created as one of 74 divisions within Queensland under the Divisional Boards Act 1879 with a population of 1339.

On 25 June 1880, Ballandean Division (to the south) was abolished and absorbed into Stanthorpe Division.

With the passage of the Local Authorities Act 1902, Stanthorpe Division became the Shire of Stanthorpe on 31 March 1903.

In 1914, the Stanthorpe Shire Council constructed council chambers.

On 15 March 2008, under the Local Government (Reform Implementation) Act 2007 passed by the Parliament of Queensland on 10 August 2007, the Shire of Stanthorpe merged with the Shire of Warwick to form the Southern Downs Region. At the time of its closure it had eight councillors plus an elected mayor.

Towns and localities 
The Shire of Stanthorpe included the following settlements:

 Stanthorpe
 Amiens
 Applethorpe
 Ballandean
 Cottonvale*
 Dalcouth
 Diamondvale
 Eukey
 Glen Aplin
 Greenlands
 Kyoomba
 Lyra
 Messines
 Mingoola
 Passchendaele
 Pikedale
 Pikes Creek
 Pozieres
 Severnlea
 Somme
 The Summit
 Thorndale
 Wallangarra
 Wyberba

* - acquired its name from one Private E Cotton a local who enlisted in the Australian Air Force

Chairmen
 1927: Johnston Smyth

Population

References

Former local government areas of Queensland
Darling Downs
1879 establishments in Australia
2008 disestablishments in Australia
Populated places disestablished in 2008